Who Framed Roger Rabbit is a media franchise owned by The Walt Disney Company and Amblin Entertainment, that began with the 1988 film, Who Framed Roger Rabbit, itself based on a book titled Who Censored Roger Rabbit? by Gary K. Wolf.

The original film was released through Disney's Touchstone Pictures banner on June 22, 1988, and became a blockbuster hit. It brought a renewed interest in the Golden Age of American animation, spearheading modern American animation and the Disney Renaissance. It won three Academy Awards for Best Film Editing, Best Sound Effects Editing and Best Visual Effects and received a Special Achievement Academy Award for its animation direction by Williams. In 2016, it was selected for preservation in the United States National Film Registry by the Library of Congress as being "culturally, historically, or aesthetically significant".

There's also media related to the 1988 film Who Framed Roger Rabbit, including books, three animated shorts, comic books, and video games.

Books

Who Censored Roger Rabbit?
Who Censored Roger Rabbit? by Gary K. Wolf is the book on which the film is loosely based.

Who Framed Roger Rabbit
Who Framed Roger Rabbit by Martin Noble is the novelization of the film of the same name.

Who P-P-P-Plugged Roger Rabbit?
Who P-P-P-Plugged Roger Rabbit? is a humorous mystery novel written by Gary K. Wolf released in 1991. The book is inconsistent with and so is neither a sequel nor a prequel to Who Censored Roger Rabbit? or the film adaptation by Disney. It could be considered a reboot. The original novel was retconned as a dream of Jessica, in chapter 12.

The novel features the original main characters Roger Rabbit, Eddie Valiant, Jessica Rabbit, and Baby Herman. Their personalities conform to those established in the Who Framed Roger Rabbit film, such as Jessica's devotion to Roger and Roger's cartoony quirks such as his speech impediment.

The story starts out with Eddie Valiant at the front door of Roger Rabbit's house. Almost immediately after he is let inside the house, Roger tells him about the upcoming Gone with the Wind toon adaptation and how he has a chance to play the lead as Rhett Butler. However, the Telltale News, a newspaper that tends to toons, prints an article about Jessica Rabbit and her relationship with Clark Gable. Introduced in this novel is Jessica's diminutive twin sister, Joellyn, who becomes Eddie's main love interest as he has broken up with his girlfriend. We also meet Eddie's sister, who is in a mixed-race marriage with a toon, and has three children with her toon husband. From here, the story branches out to the murders of Kirk Enigman (another candidate for the part of Rhett Butler), Baby Herman, and Dodger Rabbit (Roger Rabbit's evil cousin).

Who Wacked Roger Rabbit?
Who Wacked Roger Rabbit? is a mystery-humor novel written by Gary K. Wolf released in 2013.

Children's picture books
Roger Rabbit: A Different Toon by Justine Korman 
Roger Rabbit: Make the World Laugh by Justine Korman 
Who Framed Roger Rabbit: The Movie Storybook by Justine Korman  (1988)

Films

Who Framed Roger Rabbit (1988)

Animated short films 

Walt Disney Feature Animation produced a series of animated shorts featuring Roger Rabbit, following the release of the film. The three shorts (Tummy Trouble, Roller Coaster Rabbit, and Trail Mix-Up), were presented in front of various Disney/Touchstone features in an attempt to revive short subject animation as a part of the movie-going experience. Of the 3 shorts, only the first is "complete", the other 2 films ending with Roger wrecking the sets.

Cast and characters 
 A dark gray cell indicates the character did not appear in that installment.
 A  indicates a character appears in an cameo appearance.
 An  indicates a performer stood in as their character's singing voice.
 A  indicates an actor or actress was not credited for their respective role.

Video games 
 The Bugs Bunny Crazy Castle – Released in 1989, featured on the Japanese FDS version under the title Roger Rabbit.
 Who Framed Roger Rabbit – Released in 1988 for MS-DOS, Amiga, Atari ST, Apple II and Commodore 64 by Buena Vista Software.
 Who Framed Roger Rabbit – Released in 1989 for Nintendo Entertainment System by LJN.
 Hare Raising Havoc – Released in 1991 for Amiga and MS-DOS by BlueSky Software.
 Who Framed Roger Rabbit – Released in 1991 for Game Boy by Capcom.

Comic books

Roger Rabbit
Roger Rabbit is a comic book series by Disney Comics starring characters from the 1988 film, Who Framed Roger Rabbit, as well as following continuity from the film. It spawned a spin-off series entitled Roger Rabbit's Toontown, which lasted five issues.

The series continues the adventures of Roger Rabbit, who has since returned to working for Maroon Cartoons, now under C.B. Maroon (a character introduced in the graphic novel, Roger Rabbit: The Resurrection of Doom). The comics are usually split into two stories, with one main feature focusing on Roger's adventures, and a back-up feature presented to look like an actual animated subject.

While characters such as Jessica Rabbit, Baby Herman and Benny the Cab all appear in the stories, Eddie Valiant is seldom seen, replaced by a new detective character named Rick Flint. This is explained in the first issue. It is explained that when Roger went to Eddie with a new case, Eddie was too busy with new cases brought on by his new-found fame after defeating Judge Doom twice. Eddie then refers Roger to a "new kid" private detective, Rick Flint. The actual editorial reason for omitting Eddie Valiant from the comic was not having the likeness rights to make Eddie resemble Bob Hoskins. Two other new characters introduced were Lenny, a toon plane who is Benny's cousin, and Mel, who is Roger's sentient mailbox.

The series had a one-off 3D strip as part of the Disney's Comics in 3-D series, which reprints the back-up features of earlier comics and converted them into 3D. The comic-book line lasted 18 issues, and continued until the implosion of Disney Comics.

Roger Rabbit's Toontown
Roger Rabbit's Toontown was a comic book published by Disney Comics.  It features Roger and his supporting characters from Disney and Amblin Entertainment's Who Framed Roger Rabbit. Every issue began with a Roger Rabbit story and his supporting characters such as his wife Jessica, his co star Baby and his taxi cab friend Benny round out the comic. This comic book lasted for five issues from May to August 1991.

This comic book is similar to the Roger Rabbit version of Walt Disney's Comics and Stories.

Graphic novels and trade paperbacks
Who Framed Roger Rabbit (based on the movie)
Roger Rabbit: Tummy Trouble (based on the animated short)
Roger Rabbit: Who Framed Rick Flint (trade paperback featuring a story line from the Roger Rabbit comic series)

Roger Rabbit: The Resurrection of Doom
Roger Rabbit: The Resurrection of Doom is a graphic novel sequel that takes place between the film Who Framed Roger Rabbit and the Roger Rabbit short film Tummy Trouble. It also helped to set the scene for the Roger Rabbit comic-book series by Disney Comics.

Plot summary
The comic opens with a documentary about the origin of Judge Doom.  The documentary mentions the original character cel used to create Doom. Eddie Valiant is given credit for ending Doom's reign of terror by dissolving him in a puddle of Dip, stated as 'A victim of his own evil creation', and putting a stop to his plans to erase Toontown and build a freeway where it would have once stood.

A weasel, Slimy, is shown watching the documentary. He goes with two other weasels, Flasher and Ragtag, to find the original cel of Doom. They manipulate some animators to bring Doom back to life. With time, Doom remembers everything that happened to him, and now wants revenge against both Eddie Valiant and Roger Rabbit for ruining his plans.

Meanwhile, Eddie Valiant is called by C.B. Maroon, the late R.K. Maroon’s brother and new executive of Maroon Cartoons, who announces they are reopening the studio, and pays Valiant $500 to run a search on the background of Roger Rabbit. Valiant finds Roger's records clean as a whistle.

Meanwhile, Roger and Jessica Rabbit are enjoying life at home as much as possible, despite Roger's unemployment following the closing of Maroon Cartoon Studios. Roger gets a call from Maroon Cartoons, saying they are reopening the studio, and that they want Roger to come work for them. Roger accepts the offer, and the next day, Roger meets C.B. Maroon, who starts Roger off with a very low-budget film (depicted in a Hanna-Barbera-esque style). Roger angrily objects to his part in the film, and is fired ("Get me that other rabbit with the tiger for a buddy!").

The next day, Roger finds dozens of scandalous, untrue headlines centered on himself. He turns to Valiant to find out why this is happening. Valiant first meets with C.B. Maroon, and questions him about firing Roger. Maroon reveals himself as Doom, tells his plan to ruin Roger's reputation and then kill him. He and the weasels knock Valiant out and lock him up in a storage locker, where Valiant meets the real C.B. Maroon. Doom, as C.B. Maroon, puts Maroon Studios up for auction, and the studio will be officially sold at noon.

Meanwhile, Roger and Jessica are about to leave for Simi Valley, but first go to Valiant's office to say goodbye, only to find the office ransacked. Jessica finds indentations of the address Valiant wrote on the last piece of paper he used. Rushing to the address, they find and rescue Eddie Valiant and C.B. Maroon. They leave to save Maroon Studios. Valiant sprays him and his weasels with the Dip-filled gag squirt gun, and before dissolving, "Maroon" reveals himself to be Doom.

The real C.B. Maroon announces he is re-opening Maroon Cartoon Studios, and will be providing all the toon employees with work, including Roger Rabbit and Baby Herman with a line-up of new animated short films, starting with Tummy Trouble.

References

External links 
List of Roger Rabbit publications in the INDUCKS database

franchise
Touchstone Pictures franchises